Clear Lake, Ontario may refer to:

Clear Lake, a community in Bracebridge, Ontario
Clear Lake, Parry Sound District, Ontario

See also

Clear Lake (disambiguation)